Isaac Master (March 19, 1834 – 1898) was an Ontario farmer and political figure. He represented Waterloo South in the Legislative Assembly of Ontario as a Liberal member from 1878 to 1890.

He was born in Wilmot Township, Waterloo County, Upper Canada in 1834, of Pennsylvania Dutch descent. In 1857, he married Lydia Fried. He was first elected to the Ontario assembly in a by-election held after the death of John Fleming. He was elected again in an 1882 by-election after James Livingston was elected to the House of Commons. In 1891, he was named registrar for the county and moved to Berlin (later Kitchener). He served in that post until his death in 1898.

External links 
Member's parliamentary history for the Legislative Assembly of Ontario
The Canadian parliamentary companion, 1887 JA Gemmill
A Biographical history of Waterloo township and other townships of the county ...,EE Eby (1896)

1834 births
1898 deaths
Ontario Liberal Party MPPs
People from the Regional Municipality of Waterloo